Andolalao Rakotoarison (born 1982 in Mahajanga) is a Malagasy herpetologist.

Life and research 
Rakotoarison conducted her Master's thesis at the University of Antananarivo in 2011. She then conducted her PhD at the Technical University of Braunschweig on the systematics of the frogs of the Madagascar-endemic narrow-mouthed frog subfamily Cophylinae, under the supervision of Professor Miguel Vences. As of mid-2020, she has co-authored the description of 52 frog species and two reptiles (one gecko and one chameleon). In particular, Rakotoarison has contributed to knowledge of Madagascar's smallest frogs. In 2017, she led a study published as a monograph with sixteen other coauthors, describing 26 new species of the genus Stumpffia, including several frogs that number among the smallest in the world, and in 2020, she was also involved in the description of five more miniaturised frogs, including the new genus Mini and its three diminutive species.

After completing her PhD thesis in 2017, Rakotoarison was appointed as a lecturer at Soavinandriana in Itasy, Madagascar, an affiliate of the University of Antananrivo. In 2017 she also became co-chair of the IUCN SSC Amphibian Specialist Group for Madagascar, a position she still holds today. 
Currently, Rakotoarison is the Academic Director for the 'Madagascar: Biodiversity and Natural Resource Management' study abroad programme of the SIT Graduate Institute.

Matronyms 
In 2019, the frog species Platypelis ando was named in honour of Rakotoarison in recognition of her contributions to research on the amphibians of Madagascar.

References 

1982 births
Living people
Herpetologists
Women zoologists
21st-century women scientists
Malagasy scientists
Malagasy women
21st-century zoologists
University of Antananarivo alumni
Academic staff of the University of Antananarivo
People from Boeny
Technical University of Braunschweig alumni